These are the results of the women's individual all-around competition, one of six events for female competitors in artistic gymnastics at the 2000 Summer Olympics in Sydney. The qualification and final rounds took place on September 17 and 21 at the Sydney SuperDome.

World all-around silver medalist Viktoria Karpenko led the competition until the last rotation, but was thrown from first place after she stubbed her toe, tripped, and fell out of bounds on floor exercise.

The all-around competition in the discipline of women's artistic gymnastics (WAG) was marred by three separate scandals.

The vault apparatus was set incorrectly for more than half of the meet, and consequently many gymnasts fell and/or were injured on the event. Officials blamed the series of falls and low scores on performance anxiety. It wasn't until Australian gymnast Allana Slater and her coach, Peggy Liddick, voiced concerns about the equipment that officials discovered the apparatus was five centimetres, or almost two inches, lower than it should've been. While athletes were given the opportunity to perform again, for some of them, the damage to their mental or physical health caused by the vault was irreparable. Chinese gymnast Kui Yuanyuan and American gymnast Kristen Maloney both injured their legs while attempting to stick their landings, with Kui needing to be carried to an examination area and Maloney damaging a titanium rod that had recently been implanted in her shin. Romanian gymnast Andreea Răducan ultimately took gold while her teammates, Simona Amânar and Maria Olaru took silver and bronze, respectively. This is the second all-around title won by a Romanian after Nadia Comăneci.

Andreea Răducan, who initially won the event, had her medal stripped after testing positive for pseudoephedrine, which was in a medication given to her by the team doctor. Raducan appealed the disqualification because she did not take the substance knowingly, nor was she responsible for the error; the IOC admitted Raducan was not at fault, but nonetheless upheld the decision, citing a strict liability standard.

Finally, Dong Fangxiao was found in 2010 to have been 14 years old, two years under the minimum age to compete, at the Sydney Olympics. Consequently, all of her results from the Olympics were deleted from the records.

Results

Qualification

Sixty-four gymnasts competed in the all-around during the qualification round on September 17.  The thirty-six highest scoring gymnasts advanced to the final on September 21.  Each country was limited to three competitors in the final.

Final

1 Annika Reeder was forced to withdraw after being injured on the faulty vaulting horse.

2 Răducan originally won the event, but was disqualified after testing positive for pseudoephedrine.

3 Dong Fongxiao originally finished 25th, but was disqualified in 2010 after the IGF discovered she was 14 (and thus under the minimum age to compete) during the Olympics.

Remaining placings

References

Women's artistic individual all-around
2000
Olympics
2000 in women's gymnastics
Women's events at the 2000 Summer Olympics
Olympic Games controversies